The 2021 Horizon League men's soccer tournament was the postseason men's soccer tournament for the Horizon League. It was held from November 7 through November 13, 2021. The quarterfinals of the tournament were held at campus sites, while semifinals and final took place at Oakland Soccer Field in Rochester, Michigan. The six team single-elimination tournament consisted of three rounds based on seeding from regular season conference play. The Milwaukee Panthers were the defending champions.  They were unable to defend their crown, falling to Cleveland State in the Semifinals.  Oakland finished as tournament champions after defeating Cleveland State 3–1 in the Final. This was the third overall title for Oakland, all of which have come under head coach Eric Pogue. As tournament champions, Oakland earned the Horizon League's automatic berth into the 2021 NCAA Division I men's soccer tournament.

Seeding 
Six Horizon League schools participated in the tournament. Teams were seeded by conference record.  The top two seeds received byes to the Semifinals and the number one seed hosted the Semifinals and Final.  A tiebreaker was required to determine the sixth and final seed of the tournament as Robert Morris and Wright State both finished with 4–5–1 conference records. Robert Morris earned the sixth seed by virtue of their 2–1 win over Wright State on October 2.

Bracket

Source:

Schedule

Quarterfinals

Semifinals

Final

Statistics

Goalscorers

All-Tournament team

Source:

MVP in bold

References 

2021 Horizon League men's soccer season
Horizon League Men's Soccer Tournament